Coleophora ichthyura is a moth of the family Coleophoridae. It is found in Tajikistan.

The larvae feed on Atraphaxis spinosa. They feed on the bast of their host plant.

References

ichthyura
Moths described in 1976
Moths of Asia